Hudson is a township municipality incorporating the congruent geographic township in Timiskaming District in northeastern Ontario, Canada. Hudson is located directly west of the city of Temiskaming Shores and has only one named settlement, the community of Hillview.

History
Hudson was surveyed in 1887. However, the first settlers did not arrive until 1897, and the township was incorporated in 1904. The first Census of Canada to take place after settlement, in 1901, recorded the population as 46.

Demographics 

Transportation
Ontario Highway 65 passes through the township on its way from Temiskaming Shores towards Matachewan.

See also
List of townships in Ontario
List of francophone communities in Ontario

References

External links

Hudson's Bay Company trading posts
Municipalities in Timiskaming District
Single-tier municipalities in Ontario
Township municipalities in Ontario